Selman is an unincorporated community in Calhoun County, Florida, United States.  It is located on State Road 69.

Geography
Selman is located at  (30.5358, -85.0286).

References

Unincorporated communities in Calhoun County, Florida
Unincorporated communities in Florida